Rossiya Tournament 1986 in bandy was played in Irkutsk in the period 11-16 January 1986, and was won by the Soviet Union. Beside the usual national teams there was also a temporary team representing the Russian Soviet Federative Socialist Republic, the biggest state of the Soviet Union; the regular Russia national team was set up six years later, after the dissolution of the Soviet Union.

The tournament was decided by round-robin results like a group stage.

Results

Sources 
 Norges herrlandskamper i bandy
 Sverige-Sovjet i bandy
 Rossijaturneringen 

1986 in Soviet sport
1986 in bandy
1986